Lankascincus taprobanensis, also known commonly as the Ceylon tree skink and the smooth Lanka skink, is a species of lizard in the family Scincidae. The species is endemic to the island of Sri Lanka.

Habitat and distribution
It is common in the Horton Plains, Hakgala, Namunukula, and Nuwara Eliya.

Description
The body of L. taprobanensis is stout, and the length of the tail is 1.3 to 1.5 times that of the body. The fronto-parietals are distinct. The parietals are in narrow contact. There are 24 to 27 rows of scales at midbody. There are 9 to 17 lamellae under the fourth toe. The dorsum is gray, reddish brown, brownish yellow, or olive-colored. Each scale has a median dark spot. There is a brownish black lateral stripe with yellowish cream flecks running from the eye to the base of the tail. The venter is lemon yellow. The throat is pale blue with a few scattered dark spots. The Iris is very dark brown-colored.

Ecology and diet
The diet of the Ceylon tree skink includes insects.

Reproduction
Hatchlings measure .

References

Further reading
Boulenger GA (1887). Catalogue of the Lizards in the British Museum (Natural History). Second Edition. Volume III. ... Scincidæ .... London: Trustees of the British Museum (Natural History). (Taylor and Francis, printers). xii + 575 pp. + Plates I–XL. (Lygosoma taprobanense, pp. 319–320).
Kelaart [EF] (1854). "Descriptions of new species of Ceylon Reptiles". Annals and Magazine of Natural History, Second Series 13: 407–408. (Eumeces taprobanensis, new species, p. 407).
Somaweera R, Somaweera N (2009). Lizards of Sri Lanka, A Colour Guide with Field Keys. Frankfurt am Main, Germany: Edition Chimaira / Serpents Tale. 304 pp. .

External links
 Photos of the smooth Lanka skink

Lankascincus
Reptiles of Sri Lanka
Endemic fauna of Sri Lanka
Taxa named by Edward Frederick Kelaart
Reptiles described in 1854